The 2013 North American Soccer League season was the 46th season of Division II soccer in the United States and the third season of the revived North American Soccer League. It was contested by eight teams including one from Canada. Expansion club New York Cosmos was added to the NASL during the season. A split season format was used for the first time. Puerto Rico Islanders, originally planned to take part in this season, as they did in first two editions, took the year off, due to planned restructuring. The defending Soccer Bowl champions were the Tampa Bay Rowdies, while the San Antonio Scorpions were the defending North American Supporters' Trophy winners.

Personnel and sponsorship

Note1: Flags indicate national team as has been defined under FIFA eligibility rules. Players and managers may hold one or more non-FIFA nationalities.

Managerial changes

Transfers

Teams

Spring season 

The New York Cosmos and the Puerto Rico Islanders did not participate in the spring season.
 (April 6 to July 4)

Standings

Results

Fall season 
The New York Cosmos began participating in the fall season. (August 3 to November 2)

Standings

Results

Soccer Bowl 2013 

Soccer Bowl 2013 was contested by the winners of the spring and fall seasons. The game was hosted by the winner of the spring season.

Statistical leaders

Top scorers

Source:

Top assists

Source:

|}

Top goalkeepers
(Minimum of 10 Games Played)

Individual awards

Monthly awards

League awards

 Golden Ball (MVP):  Georgi Hristov (Tampa Bay Rowdies)
 Golden Boot:  Brian Shriver (Carolina RailHawks)
 Golden Glove: Kyle Reynish (New York Cosmos)
 Coach of the Year: Brian Haynes (Atlanta Silverbacks)
 Goal of the Year: Henry Lopez (New York Cosmos)

Attendance
For 2013 the teams had the following average attendance:

References

External links 
 

 
North American Soccer League seasons
2